On the Sidewalk Bleeding is a short story by American author Ed McBain, also known as Evan Hunter. The story was first published in Manhunt magazine in 1956. Its protagonist, a sixteen-year-old boy named Andy,  bleeds to death on the sidewalk after being stabbed below the ribs by a member of a rival gang. The story is commonly used as teaching material in elementary schools, high schools and colleges. According to Evan Hunter, this was one of his most anthologized stories, together with First Offence and The Last Spin.

Summary

The short story takes place during the last minutes of 16-year-old Andy's life. Andy is a member of a gang called "The Royals," as shown by the purple jacket he is wearing. He leaves his girlfriend, Laura, at a dance to buy a pack of cigarettes and is stabbed by a member of a rival gang, called The Guardians, in the process; he is slow to realize the severity of the wound due to ignorance and shock. Andy eventually realizes that he is slowly dying. Due to him being unable to speak and laying helplessly in an alley, a drunk man comes down the alley and assumes Andy is also drunk and staggers off, telling him that he is lucky and he won't call the police. A young boy named Freddie and his girlfriend Angela notice him, but refrain from helping due to fear of getting involved in gang warring. An elderly lady digs through trash cans nearby but does not hear him call out because she is partially deaf, and the sound of rain splattering the trash cans is also drowning out his voice. In his final moments, Andy realizes the Royals jacket cost him his life and, with the last of his strength, he shrugs off the jacket. A few minutes after midnight, Laura leaves the dance to find him and, after discovering his lifeless body, finds a cop. The cop notices Andy's jacket and says, "A Royal huh?" to which Laura iterates that “His name was Andy.” The cop ignores her and repeats “A Royal," and writes on his clack pad.

References

Works by Evan Hunter
American short stories
1956 short stories